Gloria Corina Peter Tiwet, Malaysia's High Commissioner to Nigeria, is "the first Sarawakian woman from the Dayak ethnic group to be appointed as a Malaysian High Commissioner".

Tiwet is concurrently accredited to Benin, Cameroon, Chad, the Central African Republic, Equatorial Guinea and Gabon. She began on 4 April 2018 and presented her letter of credence to Nigerian president Muhammadu Buhari on 12 September 2018.

Tiwat is the second Bidayuh to be appointed high commissioner/ambassador after Datuk John Tenewi Nuek.

References

Dayak people
Malaysian women ambassadors
High Commissioners of Malaysia to Nigeria
High Commissioners of Malaysia to Cameroon
Ambassadors of Malaysia to Benin
Ambassadors of Malaysia to Chad
Ambassadors of Malaysia to the Central African Republic
Ambassadors of Malaysia to Equatorial Guinea
Ambassadors of Malaysia to Gabon
Living people
Year of birth missing (living people)